Stan Freberg's Federal Budget Review was a 1980 PBS television special lampooning the federal government of the United States of America. It was produced by Donna Freberg, co-produced by Verne Langdon, and executive produced by Bob Chitester.

References

1980s American television specials
PBS original programming
1982 television specials